TAROM Flight 3107 was a charter flight operated by a Boeing 737-300 that, on 30 December 2007, during the takeoff procedure, hit a service car carrying out repair work on lighting equipment on the runway at Henri Coandă International Airport in Otopeni, Romania.

Accident
Flight 3107 was a charter flight from Bucharest's main Otopeni airport to the holiday destination Sharm el-Sheikh's main airport in Egypt. Just before 11:00 in the morning a team of maintenance workers entered runway 08R at OTP to do maintenance work on the runway's center lights. The maintenance team consisted of four workers and two vehicles. Two of the workers were working at about 600 meters from the threshold and the other two workers were working at about 1500 meters from the threshold. Visibility at the time was poor due to thick fog.

At 10:49 the maintenance team contacted the control tower to get approval for starting the cleaning operations of the center lights. Just under ten minutes later, the tower approved the start of the work. At one point, the workers were required to leave the runway to allow an aircraft to take off, but they were cleared to begin work again shortly afterwards.

Then, at 11:25:13, Flight 3107 was cleared to enter runway 08R for takeoff, and just over a minute later they were cleared for take off. Between 11:26:40 and 11:26:50 the control tower asked the maintenance workers if the runway was clear but got no reply. At 11:27:04, accelerating for takeoff, at a speed of about 90 kts, the Boeing 737 hit a car 600 meters past the runway threshold with the number 1 engine and with the left landing gear.

The aircraft ran off the left side of the runway and came to rest 137 meters left of the center line and 950 meters from the threshold. The passengers were evacuated via the emergency chutes.

Nicolae Ghinescu, the pilot in command of Flight 3107, who had over twenty-two years of flying experience, told journalists that "during the takeoff procedure, after 400 or 500 meters, we met a car-obstacle, and we could not avoid it." he said. "The car was unsignalized nor had beacons lit, and two people tried to move the car to clear the runway, but it was too late".

Aftermath
The Boeing 737 used for flight 3107 was written-off, being damaged beyond repair following collision with the maintenance car and veering off the runway. The crash was the 17th loss of a Boeing 737-300.

See also

Aviation safety
List of accidents and incidents involving commercial aircraft
Singapore Airlines Flight 006, a flight that collided with construction equipment after attempting to takeoff from the wrong runway.

References

External links
 
 Preliminary report  at Realiatea.net
Pictures with YR-BGC:
 Photos @ Airliners.net
 Photos @ JetPhotos.Net
 Photos @ PlanePictures.net

2007 in Romania
Accidents and incidents involving the Boeing 737 Classic
Airliner accidents and incidents involving fog
3107
Aviation accidents and incidents in Romania
Aviation accidents and incidents in 2007
December 2007 events in Europe
2007 disasters in Romania